Terasakiella salincola is a Gram-negative, S-shaped, facultatively anaerobic and motile bacterium species from the genus Terasakiella which has been isolated from seawater from Korea.

References

Rhodospirillales
Bacteria described in 2018